Imielno may refer to the following places:
Imielno, Gniezno County in Greater Poland Voivodeship (west-central Poland)
Imielno, Łódź Voivodeship (central Poland)
Imielno, Świętokrzyskie Voivodeship (south-central Poland)
Imielno, Słupca County in Greater Poland Voivodeship (west-central Poland)